Shyam Fernando, is an actor in Sri Lankan cinema, stage drama, and television. He is a dubbing artist and was nominated for several dramatic roles.

Career
Fernando started his drama career under Somalatha Subasinghe with Play House Kotte. He joined Subasinghe's children’s productions such as Thoppi Welenda, Hima Kumari, and Walas Pawula. He was then selected for the play Veeraya Marila directed by Rajitha Dissanayake.

Fernando started his film career with a role in Oba Nathuwa Oba Ekka in 2012, directed by Prasanna Vithanage. His most popular cinema acting came through films Premaya Nam, Oba Nathuwa Oba Ekka, and Davena Wihagun. In 2020, he acted in the short One Blood directed by Chathura Fernando. In August 2020, he won the award for the Best Actor at the Hollywood Venus Awards short film festival at Istanbul in Turkey.

Notable music videos
 Sakura-Charitha athalage

Notable theater works
 Adara Wasthuwa
 Bakamuna Weedi Basi 
 Hithala Gaththu Theeranayak
 Nethuwa Bari Minihek
 Siriwardane Pawla

Notable television works
 Ado
 Ammai Duwai
 Appachchi
 Chandi Kumarihami 
 Raavana
 See Raja
 Thaththa
 Thumpane

Filmography

 No. denotes the Number of Sri Lankan films in the Sri Lankan cinema and Indian Cinema debut.

Awards and accolades
He has won several awards at the local film, stage drama festivals and television festivals.

State Drama Festival

|-
|| 2014 ||| Adara Wasthuwa || Best Actor ||

Signis Awards

|-
|| 2015 ||| Oba Nathuwa Oba Ekka || Best Actor ||

Presidential Film Awards

|-
|| 2017 ||| Oba Nathuwa Oba Ekka || Best Actor ||

Sumathi Awards

|-
|| 2018 ||| See Raja || Best Actor ||

Raigam Tele'es

|-
|| 2018 ||| Thaththa || Best Actor ||

Derana Film Awards

|-
|| 2018 ||| Oba Nathuwa Oba Ekka || Best Actor ||

Hiru Golden Film Awards

|-
|| 2016 ||| Oba Nathuwa Oba Ekka || Best Actor ||

References

External links
 Physical absences and imagined presences
 2012 රාජ්‍ය නාට්‍ය උළෙලේදී සම්මානයට ලක්‌වූවෝ

Sri Lankan male film actors
Sinhalese male actors
Living people
Year of birth missing (living people)